Malan may refer to:

People (family name)
 Adolf Malan (born 1961), South African rugby union footballer
César Malan (1787–1864), Swiss Protestant minister and hymn-writer
Solomon Caesar Malan (1812–1894), Orientalist
David H. Malan (1922–2020), British psychotherapist
Pedro Malan (born 1943), Brazilian economist and former Minister of Finance
Lucio Malan (born 1960), Italian politician
Dawid Malan (born 1987), English cricketer
Charl Malan (born 1989), English cricketer
Pieter Malan (born 1989), South African cricketer
Andre Malan (born 1991), South African cricketer
Janneman Malan (born 1996), South African cricketer

Members of the South African Malan family 

F. S. Malan (1871–1941), South African Minister of Education 1910–24
Daniel François Malan (D. F. Malan, 1874–1959), Prime Minister of South Africa 1948–54
Adolph Malan (AKA Sailor Malan, 1910–1963), Royal Air Force fighter ace in the Second World War
Magnus Malan (1930–2011), general, Chief of the South African Army, Chief of the South African Defence Force and Minister of Defence, 1980–1991
Wynand Malan (born 1943), Afrikaner South African politician
Rian Malan (born 1954), author, journalist and political activist

People (other name)
Malan Breton (born 1973), Taiwanese-born fashion designer and media personality

Places
 Malan River, a river in western India in Gujarat
 Malan Subdistrict (马栏街道), subdistrict in Shahekou, Liaoning, China
 Malan, Henan, town in Yanling County, Xuchang, Henan, China
 Malan, Shaanxi (马栏镇), town in Xunyi County, Shaanxi, China
 Malan, Shanxi (马兰镇), town in Gujiao, Shanxi, China

 Malan (film), a 1942 Bollywood film
 Malan (馬蘭) was the name of an elephant in Taipei Zoo who was the partner of Lin Wang
Malan is a Hindu, Sikh Jat Caste from Uttarpradesh, Punjab and Rajasthan

See also
Ma Lan (born 1962), Chinese Huangmei opera performer

French-language surnames
Surnames of French origin
Afrikaans-language surnames